Yery with macron (Ы̄ ы̄; italics: Ы̄ ы̄) is a letter of the Cyrillic script.

Yery with macron is used in the Aleut (Bering dialect), Evenki, Mansi, Nanai, Negidal, Ulch and Selkup languages.

References

See also
Cyrillic characters in Unicode
Ȳ ȳ : Latin letter Y with macron

Cyrillic letters with diacritics
Letters with macron